The Angeln is a breed of cattle originally from Angeln in Schleswig-Holstein where they are first mentioned around 1600. however some people think that they may have existed for over 5000 years. Breed management has been practiced since 1830. Angeln cattle are red in color and were one of the founders of the larger Danish Red Cattle breed. They are noted for the high milkfat level of their milk. Angeln cows produce an average 7570 kg (16,700 lb) of 4.81% fat milk.

See also
List of German cattle breeds

References

External links
Angeln entry at Breeds of Livestock, Oklahoma State University website

Cattle breeds
Cattle breeds originating in Germany
Animal breeds on the GEH Red List

Red cattle